Wolf-Dietrich Wilcke (11 March 1913 – 23 March 1944) was a German Luftwaffe pilot during World War II, a fighter ace credited with 162 enemy aircraft shot down in 732 combat missions. He claimed the  majority of his victories over the Eastern Front, and 25 over the Western Front, including four four-engined bombers.

Born in Schrimm in the Province of Posen, Wilcke volunteered for military service in the Reichswehr of Nazi Germany in 1934. Initially serving in the Heer (Army), he transferred to the Luftwaffe (Air Force) in 1935. Following flight training, he was posted to Jagdgeschwader "Richthofen" (Fighter Wing "Richthofen") in April 1936. After an assignment as fighter pilot instructor he volunteered for service with the Condor Legion during the Spanish Civil War in early 1939. After his return from Spain, he was appointed Staffelkapitän (squadron leader) of the 7. Staffel (7th squadron) of Jagdgeschwader 53 (JG 53—53rd Fighter Wing). Following the outbreak of World War II, he claimed his first aerial victory on 7 November 1939. On 18 May 1940, during the Battle of France, he was shot down and taken prisoner of war. After the armistice with France, he returned from captivity and was appointed Gruppenkommandeur (group commander) of the III. Gruppe (3rd group) of JG 53 during the Battle of Britain, claiming 10 victories over England.

Wilcke then fought in the aerial battles of Operation Barbarossa, the German invasion of the Soviet Union. There, after 25 aerial victories, he was awarded the Knight's Cross of the Iron Cross on 6 August 1941. In September 1941, he relocated with his group to the Mediterranean Theater, where he was able to claim further victories. At the end of May 1942, he was transferred to the Stab (headquarters unit) of Jagdgeschwader 3 (JG 3—3rd Fighter Wing) "Udet", and that August he was appointed as its Geschwaderkommodore (wing commander). Following his 100th aerial victory on 6 September, he received the Knight's Cross of the Iron Cross with Oak Leaves. During the Battle of Stalingrad, on 17 December, he claimed his 150th aerial victory. On 23 December 1942, he was awarded the Knight's Cross of the Iron Cross with Oak Leaves and Swords, his total now 155 aerial victories.

Subsequent to the presentation of the Swords to his Knight's Cross, he was officially banned from operational flying. Occasionally he still flew combat missions and on 23 March 1944, flying in defense of the Reich, he claimed his 162nd and last aerial victory and was killed in action by United States Army Air Forces long-range P-51 Mustang fighters near Schöppenstedt, in Lower Saxony.

Early life and career 
Wilcke was born on 11 March 1913 at Schrimm in the Province of Posen, part of the Kingdom of Prussia at the time, now Śrem in the Greater Poland Voivodeship, Poland. He was the son of a Hauptmann (captain) of Infanterie-Regiment 47 (47th Infantry Regiment), Hans Wilcke, who died of pneumonia when Wilcke was just four weeks of age. His mother, Hertha von Schuckmann, married again on 14 June 1919. In 1931, Wilcke was arrested for attending a then-illegal demonstration of the Nazi Party. Although his loyalty to the Nazi cause is emphasized multiple times in his personal military files, according to biographers Prien and Stemmer, he was a firm opponent of the National Socialist regime; later in his career, for a time after taking command of III. Gruppe (3rd group) of Jagdgeschwader 53 (JG 53—53rd Fighter Wing), he had the Swastikas on his unit's aircraft painted over. He volunteered for military service in the Reichswehr after receiving his Abitur (diploma). He joined Artillerie-Regiment 6 (6th Artillery Regiment) in Minden as a Fahnenjunker (officer cadet) on 1 April 1934. His legal guardian and stepfather, Friedrich von Scotti, also served in this regiment.

As a Fähnrich (officer candidate), Wilcke was posted to the Kriegsschule (war school) in Dresden on 1 October 1934. On 1 November 1935, he was transferred to the newly emerging Luftwaffe holding the rank of Oberfähnrich (senior officer candidate). On 20 April 1936, while serving at the flight school in Perleberg, he was promoted to Leutnant (second lieutenant). On 15 October he was transferred to Jagdgeschwader "Richthofen" (Fighter Wing "Richthofen"), also known as Jagdgeschwader 132 (JG 132—132nd Fighter Wing), named after the World War I fighter ace Manfred von Richthofen and forerunner of Jagdgeschwader 2 (JG 2—2nd Fighter Wing) "Richthofen". There he excelled as a pilot and showed exceptional leadership ability and was sent as fighter pilot instructor to the Jagdfliegerschule (fighter pilot school) in Werneuchen in the second half of 1937.

In March 1939, Wilcke volunteered for service with the Condor Legion during the Spanish Civil War. For a few weeks, he flew with 1. Staffel (1st squadron) of Jagdgruppe 88 (J/88—88th Fighter Group) without claiming any aerial victories. He was awarded the Spanish Cross in Bronze with Swords for his service in Spain. In Spain he became friends with Werner Mölders and when Mölders was appointed Gruppenkommandeur (group commander) of the newly created III. Gruppe of JG 53, he selected Wilcke as Staffelkapitän (squadron leader) of the 7. Staffel (7th squadron) of JG 53.

World War II 
World War II in Europe began on Friday, 1 September 1939, when German forces invaded Poland. Wilcke, who at the time was still a member of 3. Staffel (3rd squadron) of JG 53, flew missions over Poland. He claimed his first aerial victory on 7 November 1939, over the Western Front when he shot down an Armée de l'Air (French Air Force) Potez 630, a twin-engined fighter, near Völklingen during the Phoney War. For this achievement he was awarded the Iron Cross 2nd Class on 25 November 1939.

From 2–16 January 1940, Wilcke and other pilots from III. Gruppe went on a ski vacation to the Vorarlberg. On 11 March 1940, he shot down another Potez at an altitude of  near the "three-nations-corner" north of Metz. He claimed his third victory at 2:55 pm on 25 March. 7. In the resulting aerial battle, Wilcke shot down one of the Moranes over Diedenhofen.

Battle of France and Britain 
The Battle of France, the German invasion of France and the Low Countries, began on 10 May 1940. On 18 May 1940, he engaged in aerial combat with eight French Curtiss P-36 Hawk fighter aircraft and was shot down west of Rethel. His victor may have been sous lieutenant Camille Plubeau. Wilcke bailed out and was taken prisoner of war. Following the armistice with France, he and Mölders, who had also been a prisoner of war, returned to the unit on 30 June 1940. Wilcke was promoted to Hauptmann the next day and again took command of 7. Staffel. On 11 July 1940, he was awarded the Iron Cross 1st Class.

On 13 August 1940, during the Battle of Britain, Wilcke replaced Hauptmann Harro Harder as Gruppenkommandeur of the III. Gruppe. Harder had been last seen at 1:35 pm on 12 August and was reported as missing in action following combat east of the Isle of Wight. The day of his appointment, Wilcke almost lost his life as well, when he was forced to bail out after engine failure over the English Channel. He was rescued that night by a Dornier Do 18 flying boat. III. Gruppe flew a bomber escort mission targeting London on 30 August. Wilcke destroyed a barrage balloon on the morning mission and claimed his fourth victory, a Supermarine Spitfire in the vicinity of Dover during his second mission of the day. On 1 September 1940, on another bomber escort mission that started at 11:20 am, Wilcke claimed his fifth victory, a Hawker Hurricane, south of London. He claimed his sixth victory, probably a Fairey Swordfish biplane, on 11 September over the Channel between Dover and Calais.

On 15 September 1940, also known as the Battle of Britain Day, III. Gruppe engaged 20 to 30 Royal Air Force (RAF) fighters south of London. In the resulting combat, Wilcke claimed the destruction of his second Hurricane. Two days later, on a mission that began at 4:35 pm, Wilcke achieved his ninth victory, another Hurricane. He claimed his tenth victory, again a Hurricane, on a mission targeting the London area that took off at 11:15 am on 20 September. On the last day of September 1940, he claimed two more victories to bring his total to 12; the action took place during his second mission of the day, which began at 1:45 pm, escorting Dornier Do 17s to London. In combat with RAF Spitfires, Wilcke claimed his 13th victory at 11:45 am on 10 October 1940, his final of the Battle of Britain. In recognition of these achievements he was awarded the Honor Goblet of the Luftwaffe on 1 April 1941.

Operation Barbarossa 
On 8 June 1941, the bulk of JG 53's  air elements moved via Jever, in northern Germany, to Mannheim-Sandhofen. There the aircraft were given a maintenance overhaul prior to moving east. On 12 June, III. Gruppe was ordered to transfer to a forward airfield at Sobolewo. On 21 June, the Geschwaderkommodore (wing commander) of JG 53 and its Gruppenkommandeure were summoned to nearby Suwałki, where Generalfeldmarschall (field marshal) Albert Kesselring gave the final instructions for the upcoming attack. Wilcke briefed his pilots that evening.

On 22 June, the Geschwader crossed into Soviet airspace in support of Operation Barbarossa, the invasion of the Soviet Union, which opened the Eastern Front. III. Gruppe took off on its first mission at 3:20 am with the Gruppenstab (headquarters unit) and 7. Staffel targeting Soviet airfields at Alytus and Oranji. Wilcke shot down three Polikarpov I-15 biplane fighter aircraft. The second mission of the day by III. Gruppe was a Stuka escort mission to Grodno at 6:00 am, during which Wilcke claimed another victory. He led another attack at 4:10 pm; while strafing airfields, he claimed his fifth aerial victory of the day, an "ace-in-a-day" achievement, taking his total to 18.

On 25 June 1941, JG 53 was relocated with III. Gruppe arriving at Vilnius at 8:30 am. The same day, Wilcke was slightly injured when he collided with another aircraft during takeoff. He claimed his 19th victory on the evening of 30 June 1941, flying a combat air patrol into the Barysaw area. Wilcke was ordered to form "Gefechtsverband Wilcke" ("Battle Group Wilcke") on 1 July 1941. He commanded his III. Gruppe and II. Gruppe of Jagdgeschwader 52 (JG 52—52nd Fighter Wing) to counter-attack Soviet bombers. On 9 July, Wilcke destroyed a Petlyakov Pe-2 ground attack aircraft. He claimed a victory on 25 July during fighter escort missions in the Vyazma area. On 29 July 1941, III. Gruppe provided fighter cover for the German armored spearheads in the Dukhovshchina area. During this mission, Wilcke claimed another victory. The next day, over the spearheads at Yartsevo-Bely, Wilcke shot down a Polikarpov I-180 fighter. He was awarded the Knight's Cross of the Iron Cross on 6 August 1941 for 25 victories. Both Wilcke and Leutnant Herbert Schramm were decorated by Kesselring on 9 August 1941.

On 23 August 1941, the 9th Army began its assault on the Soviet forces in the Velikiye Luki area. Wilcke claimed two aerial victories while supporting these operations. III. Gruppe began returning to Germany in early October 1941. The air elements left the Soviet Union on 4 October, while the ground units were transported back by train to Mannheim on 13 October. Since 22 June 1941, III. Gruppe had claimed 769 aerial victories for the loss of 6 pilots killed, 7 missing in action, 2 captured and 12 wounded.

North Africa and Malta 
After its return to Germany, III. Gruppe was deployed to the Mediterranean Theater. The ground elements of III. Gruppe arrived in Catania in Sicily on 28 November 1941. Wilcke and his adjutant Jürgen Harder arrived on 2 December, with the rest of the Gruppe arriving the next day. On 6 December 1941, III. Gruppe was ordered to move to Timimi in Libya. Wilcke claimed his 34th aerial victory on 11 December, during a fighter escort mission for Junkers Ju 88 bombers attacking Bir Hakeim.

III. Gruppe relocated back to Sicily on 17 December 1941 for operations in the siege of Malta. The island of Malta had a strategically important position in the Mediterranean Sea. With the opening of a new front in North Africa in mid-1940, British air and sea forces based on the island could attack Axis ships transporting vital supplies and reinforcements from Europe to North Africa. To counter this threat, the Luftwaffe and the Regia Aeronautica (Italian Royal Air Force) conducted bombing raids to neutralize the RAF defenses and the ports. During the siege, Wilcke claimed four victories over RAF fighters in April–May 1942. He claimed his first victory during the siege, and 35th overall,  over a Spitfire fighter on 2 April 1942. His 36th aerial victory on 22 April may have been Hurricane (Z4011) "B" of No. 185 Squadron flown by Pilot Officer "Sonny" Ormrod, who was killed in the engagement. On 12 May 1942, III. Gruppe destroyed nine Spitfires, among them one by Wilcke.

Wing commander of JG 3 
On 18 May 1942, Wilcke was transferred to Jagdgeschwader 3 "Udet" (JG 3—3rd Fighter Wing), named after the World War I fighter ace Ernst Udet. Operating on the Eastern Front, Wilcke became a Geschwaderkommodore of JG 3 "Udet" on 11 August, replacing Oberst (Colonel) Günther Lützow, who was posted to the staff of the General der Jagdflieger (General of Fighters) as Inspector of the Day Fighters on the Eastern Front. Operating from the Chuguyev Airfield, JG  3 "Udet" saw combat in the Kharkov area, present-day Kharkiv, during the Second Battle of Kharkov. On 26 June 1942, JG  3 "Udet" was assembled at Schtschigry on the southern sector of the Eastern Front for the upcoming summer offensive, supporting the Wehrmacht's advance towards Stalingrad. In the following months, JG  3 "Udet" was based at airfields at Gorshechnoye, Olkhovatka, Millerovo, Nowy-Cholan, Frolovo, Tuzov and Pitomnik.

On 13 June 1942, Wilcke claimed his first victory with JG 3 "Udet", shooting down a Lavochkin-Gorbunov-Gudkov LaGG-3 fighter for his 39th victory. He followed this with another LaGG-3 on 22 June, and a LaGG-3 and a Polikarpov R-5 reconnaissance bomber on 24 June 1942. On 3 July 1942, he claimed three Douglas Boston medium bombers, followed by two LaGG-3s and another Boston the next day. He became an "ace-in-a-day" again on 6 July, shooting down a Bell P-39 Airacobra, a LaGG-3, an R-5 and three Hurricanes. Three days later, he shot down two Ilyushin Il-2 Sturmovik ground-attack aircraft and, on 10 July, four more Bostons. The next day, he claimed another R-5 and two Mikoyan-Gurevich MiG-1 fighters. On 12 July, he again claimed an R-5 and two LaGG-3s before he shot down another LaGG-3 on 18 July. On 24 July he was credited with a Polikarpov I-153 biplane fighter and two days later two Hurricanes and two Pe-2s. On both 27 and 28 July he claimed victory over a LaGG-3, his last victories in July 1942.

Wilcke's first victories in August 1942, a Sukhoi Su-2 light bomber followed by two LaGG-3s, occurred on 5 and 6 August. On 9 August he filed a victory claim for an unknown aircraft type, bringing his "score" to 79 aerial victories. He took command of JG 3 "Udet" and achieved his first victory as Geschwaderkommodore on 12 August, again over an unknown type of aircraft. He claimed eight further victories of unknown types, two on 13 August, one on 17 August, three on 20 August, and two on 23 August. His first victory on 26 August was identified as a Yakovlev Yak-7 fighter, the other two that day were again unknown types. Another series of unidentified aircraft shot down followed. He claimed one aircraft destroyed on 28 August, one more on 30 August and four on 31 August, taking his total to 96 aerial victories by the end of August 1942. Wilcke claimed his next two victories on 3 September and two more on 6 September, all four of unknown types of aircraft. This brought his total to 100 aerial victories. Wilcke was the 20th Luftwaffe pilot to achieve the century mark. On 9 September 1942, he became the 122nd officer or soldier of the Wehrmacht honored with the Knight's Cross of the Iron Cross with Oak Leaves.

Battle of Stalingrad 
From 10–19 September 1942, Wilcke claimed another series of victories over aircraft of unknown type, which included one on 10 September, one on 12 September, four on 18 September and two on 19 September. On 16 September 1942, the Soviets launched an offensive north of Stalingrad. Wilcke led about 40 serviceable German fighters against the Soviet 8 Vozdyshnaya Armiya (8 VA—8th Air Army), 16 Vozdyshnaya Armiya (16 VA—16th Air Army), and 102 Istrebitel'naya Aviatsionnaya Diviziya Protivo-Vozdushnaya Oborona (102 IAD PVO—Fighter Aviation Division of the Home Air Defense) over Stalingrad. At the time, Wilcke often flew with Hauptmann Walther Dahl as his wingman. On 20 September 1942,  Wilcke shot down two LaGG-3s. Two days later, he shot down six Yakovlev Yak-1 fighters over Stalingrad, his third "ace-in-day" feat, taking his total to 116 aerial victories. It is possible that one of his opponents was Leytenant (Second Lieutenant) Nikolai Karnachyonok of 434 Istrebitel'nyy Aviatsionyy Polk (434 IAP—434th Fighter Aviation Regiment), who was killed in action that day and was posthumously made a Hero of the Soviet Union.

The Geschwaderstab (headquarters unit) was based at the Pitomnik Airfield from 23 September to 21 November 1942. There Wilcke directed fighter operations for the Battle of Stalingrad. During the previous offensive towards Stalingrad, the Geschwaderstab of JG 3 "Udet" had claimed 137 victories, of which 97 victories were credited to Wilcke. While based at Pitomnik, Wilcke claimed four victories on 24 September, one on 25 September, three on 28 September, four on 29 September, one on 3 October and two more on 24 October. On 25 and 26 October he claimed one victory on each day and his final two while based at Pitomnik on 1 November 1942, taking his personal total to 135 victories. For these achievements he received the German Cross in Gold, awarded on 3 November 1942.

In the aftermath of the encirclement of the 6th Army on 23 November 1942, the Geschwaderstab was moved to Morozovskaya-West, outside the Stalingrad pocket. Wilcke organized fighter escort missions for the transport aircraft delivering supplies for the 6th Army. Pressed by the advancing Soviet armored spearheads, Morozovskaya-West had to be abandoned by the Geschwaderstab on 23 December, and the aircraft were moved to Morozovskaya-South, which was not yet threatened by the Soviet Army. On 3 January 1943, this airfield had to be abandoned as well and the Geschwaderstab was relocated to Tazinskaya, there it remained until the fighting over the Stalingrad pocket ended. During this period the Geschwaderstab claimed 25 victories, 21 by Wilcke and 4 by Dahl, for the loss in action of two pilots.

Wilcke claimed two victories on 24 November 1942, an Il-2 Sturmovik and a Yak-1, his first victories in support of the Stalingrad pocket. On 30 November he claimed the destruction of three aircraft of unknown type, one more on 2 December, and three more on 8 December. Four victories claimed on 12 December, one Lavochkin La-5 and three Yak-1s, took his total to 148 aerial victories. Wilcke became the fourth German fighter pilot to achieve 150 aerial victories in combat. He achieved this mark on 17 December 1942, claiming victories 149–151. The next day he claimed victory over three more aircraft. Following this 154th victory, he was awarded the Knight's Cross of the Iron Cross with Oak Leaves and Swords on 23 December 1943, the 23rd member of the Wehrmacht to be so honored. Along with the Swords came the ban from flying further operational combat missions. Although banned from flying, he was credited with two more victories on the Eastern Front, a Yak-1 on 28 December and an aircraft of unknown type on 5 January 1943.

In March 1943, Wilcke led Geschwaderstab and II. and III. Gruppe during operations against the Kuban bridgehead as part of the IV. Fliegerkorps (4th Air Corps). In early May 1943, the Geschwaderstab was ordered out of actions and returned to München-Gladbach, present-day Mönchengladbach. Wilcke had only the Geschwaderstab and I. Gruppe under his effective command and no further combat missions were flown until October 1943.

Defense of the Reich and death 
Wilcke was promoted to Oberst on 1 December 1943 and requested permission to fly operationally and lead his Geschwader from the air. In February 1944, although still officially banned from flying operations, Wilcke ignored the order and flew several missions leading his Stabsschwarm against the United States Army Air Forces (USAAF) in Defense of the Reich missions. He claimed his 157th victory, over a Lockheed P-38 Lightning, on 10 February and his 158th, over a Consolidated B-24 Liberator, on 24 February. He shot down two Boeing B-17 Flying Fortress bombers on 4 March 1944, his 159th and 160th aerial victories. On 6 March, his Bf 109G-6 was crippled in aerial combat and he made an emergency landing at Neuruppin. Combat on 6 March cost both sides heavy losses. The Eighth Air Force lost 75 four-engined bombers and 14 escort fighters, the Luftwaffe lost 65 aircraft; 36 German pilots were killed and 27 wounded.

On 23 March 1944, Wilcke led JG 3 "Udet" against a USAAF bomber formation near Braunschweig. On this day, the USAAF was attacking aircraft factories at Braunschweig and other targets of opportunity in Münster, Osnabrück and Achmer. In total, the Eighth Air Force had committed 768 B-17s and B-24s bombers to this attack, supported by 841 long-range fighters. The Luftwaffe countered this attack with 13 day fighter Gruppen, mustering 259 fighters on this day. Following combat, the Luftwaffe claimed the destruction of 51 enemy aircraft, including 44 four-engined bombers. The Luftwaffe suffered 16 pilots killed and six wounded as well as 33 aircraft lost. The USAAF reported the loss of 29 bombers and 5 escort fighters while claiming 62 German aircraft shot down and another 2 destroyed on the ground.

During this engagement, Wilcke shot down a B-17 Flying Fortress bomber and a North American P-51 Mustang fighter, but was then shot down in his Bf 109G-6 (Werknummer 160 613—factory number) near Schöppenstedt. It is assumed that the victors were Captain Don Gentile and Captain John Trevor Godfrey of the 4th Fighter Group. By this date, Wilcke had claimed 162 enemy aircraft in 732 combat missions. Wilcke had been nicknamed "Fürst" (prince) by his comrades on account of his attitude towards his men and paternal sense of responsibility. He had also been very conscious of his style and appearance and wore a very expensive and custom tailored leather coat, a trade which also added to his perception and fostered the nickname. His funeral ceremony was held at the airfield in Mönchengladbach (then "München Gladbach"). Among others, the funeral ceremony was attended by his stepfather. Wilcke was buried in the honor section of the cemetery in Mönchengladbach-Holt next to the grave of Klaus Quaet-Faslem.

Summary of career

Aerial victory claims
According to US historian David T. Zabecki, Wilcke was credited with 162 aerial victories. Mathews and Foreman, authors of Luftwaffe Aces — Biographies and Victory Claims, researched the German Federal Archives and found records for 155 aerial victory claims, plus nine further unconfirmed claims. This figure includes 138 aerial victories on the Eastern Front and 17 over the Western Allies.

Victory claims were logged to a map-reference (PQ = Planquadrat), for example "PQ 4932". These sectors were then subdivided into 36 smaller units to give a location area 3 × 4 km in size.

Awards 
 Spanish Cross in Bronze with Swords
 Wound Badge in Black
 Front Flying Clasp of the Luftwaffe in Gold with Pennant "700"
 Combined Pilots-Observation Badge
 Iron Cross (1939)
 2nd Class (25 November 1939)
 1st Class (11 July 1940)
 Honor Goblet of the Luftwaffe (1 April 1941)
 German Cross in Gold on 3 November 1942 as Major in Jagdgeschwader 3
 Knight's Cross of the Iron Cross with Oak Leaves and Swords
 Knight's Cross on 6 August 1941 as Hauptmann and Gruppenkommandeur of the III./Jagdgeschwader 53
 122nd Oak Leaves on 9 September 1942 as Hauptmann and Geschwaderkommodore of Jagdgeschwader 3 "Udet"
 23rd Swords on 23 December 1942 as Major and Geschwaderkommodore of Jagdgeschwader 3 "Udet"

Notes

References

Citations

Bibliography

Further reading 

 
 

1913 births
1944 deaths
People from Śrem
People from the Province of Posen
Aviators killed by being shot down
German World War II flying aces
German prisoners of war in World War II held by France
Luftwaffe personnel killed in World War II
Recipients of the Gold German Cross
Recipients of the Knight's Cross of the Iron Cross with Oak Leaves and Swords
German military personnel of the Spanish Civil War
German commanders at the Battle of Stalingrad
Condor Legion personnel
Reichswehr personnel